View of Florence from San Miniato is an oil on canvas painting by American artist Thomas Cole.

History
It was completed in 1837 and is currently housed at Cleveland Museum of Art.

Description
The painting is a panorama of Florence, showing a Romantic response to the Italian landscape.

References 

1837 paintings
Paintings in the collection of the Cleveland Museum of Art
Paintings by Thomas Cole
Hudson River School paintings
Cityscape paintings
Culture in Florence
Florence Cathedral
Images of Italy
Sun in art
Water in art